Daniel Ozmo (14 March 1912 – 5 September 1942) was a Yugoslav Jewish painter and printmaker. He studied in Belgrade, where he became a member of the communist progressive youth movement.

His paintings, other than of Sephardi Jewish life, portrayed social relations in rural and working class Bosnia. His works were exhibited 1932–40 in Sarajevo, where he was one of the founding group of young painters, and in Belgrade in 1937.

Ozmo was captured along with Daniel Kabiljo in Sarajevo by the Nazis after the Invasion of Yugoslavia. As he was known as a leftist activist due to his involvement with the Collegium Artisticum movement in the 1930s, Ozmo hid with his sister's family to avoid arrest, but was ambushed by the police while attempting to flee the city. He was deported to the Jasenovac concentration camp on November 16th, 1941. At the camp, he was forced to perform heavy labor such as building the camp barracks, a wire fence and a dam. Ozmo was also the kapo of an artists' workshop known as the "ceramic group" which produced "official" propaganda art for the camp. Some of these works are kept in the Historical Museum of Bosnia and Herzegovina. He was executed in the camp in 1942, either on August 1st or September 5th, by shooting.

References

External links

La Benevolencija

Bosnia and Herzegovina Sephardi Jews
Jewish painters
People who died in Jasenovac concentration camp
1912 births
1942 deaths
People from the Condominium of Bosnia and Herzegovina
Yugoslav Jews
Yugoslav painters
Yugoslav artists
Bosnia and Herzegovina artists
Bosnia and Herzegovina Jews who died in the Holocaust
Sephardi Jews who died in the Holocaust